Aquaculture in the Federated States of Micronesia includes the cultivation of giant clams and sponges. The FSM government has explored aquaculture as a possible method of stimulating the national economy and increasing the number of jobs among the nation's populace.

References

Micronesia, Federated States
Economy of the Federated States of Micronesia
Water in the Federated States of Micronesia